Royal Salute may refer to:
 honors music for royalty
 "Aash Al Maleek", the national anthem of Saudi Arabia
 "As-salam al-malaki al-urdoni", the national anthem of Jordan
 "Royal Salute" (Yemen), the national anthem of the Mutawakkilite Kingdom of Yemen
 "As-Salam al-Malaki", the national anthem of Iraq from 1932 to 1958
 “Salām-e Shāh”, royal and national anthem of the Qajar dynasty, Persia (1873–1909)
 21-gun salute in the Commonwealth
 Track #13 on The Format (album), 2006 rap album by AZ
 Royal Salute (whisky), a scotch produced by Chivas Brothers